Wood Green is a district of North London, England.

Wood Green or Woodgreen may also refer to:

Places

England
 Wood Green, Essex; See List of United Kingdom locations: Wir-Wood
 Wood Green, Norfolk; See List of United Kingdom locations: Wir-Wood
 Wood Green, West Midlands
 Wood Green, Worcestershire; See List of United Kingdom locations: Wir-Wood
 Woodgreen, Hampshire

Canada
 Woodgreen, Ontario

Schools
 Wood Green Academy, a coeducational secondary school in Wednesbury, West Midlands, England
 Wood Green School, a coeducational secondary school near Witney, Oxfordshire, England

Transport
 Wood Green bus garage, bus terminus in Wood Green, London, operated by Arriva London
 Wood Green tube station, underground railway station in Wood Green, London
 Wood Green (Old Bescot) railway station, a railway station that served the Wood Green area of the West Midlands from 1837 to 1941

Other uses
 Wood Green (UK Parliament constituency), former constituency for the House of Commons of the UK Parliament, 1918—1983
 Wood Green Quarry & Railway Cutting, a geological Site of Special Scientific Interest in Gloucestershire
 Wood Green Town F.C., former football club in Tottenham, London, England
 Woodgreen Conservation Reserve, Northern Territory, Australia
 Woodgreen Lido, an open-air swimming pool in Banbury, Herefordshire, England
 Woodgreen Pets Charity, an English charity
 Woodgreen Station, also spelt Wood Green, a cattle station in Northern Territory, Australia